Texline is a town in northwestern Dallam County, Texas, United States. The population was 507 at the 2010 Census.  The town is named for its location near the New Mexico-Texas state line. The town sits on U.S. Highway 87, which continues southeast towards Dalhart and northwest towards Clayton, New Mexico.

History of boundary dispute
For years there has been a simmering dispute over whether Texline is lawfully a part of Texas or New Mexico.  The straight north-south border between the two states was originally defined as the 103rd meridian, but the 1859 survey that was supposed to mark that boundary mistakenly set the border between  too far west of that line. this survey error resulted in the current towns of Farwell, Texline, and a part of Glenrio being within the State of Texas.  New Mexico's short border with Oklahoma, in contrast, was correctly surveyed on the meridian.  New Mexico's draft constitution in 1910 stated that the border is on the 103rd meridian as intended.  The disputed strip, hundreds of miles long, includes parts of valuable oilfields of the Permian Basin.  A bill was passed in the New Mexico Senate to fund and file a lawsuit in the U.S. Supreme Court to recover the strip from Texas, but the bill did not become law.  Today, land in the strip is included in Texas land surveys and the land and towns for all purposes are taxed and governed by the State of Texas.

Geography

Texline is located just over one mile from the New Mexico border along U.S. Highway 87 and six miles south of the Texas-Oklahoma border. Dalhart is approximately 35 miles to the southeast and Clayton, New Mexico is about 11 miles to the northwest.

Demographics

2020 census

As of the 2020 United States census, there were 448 people, 160 households, and 74 families residing in the town.

2000 census
As of the census of 2000, there were 511 people, 196 households, and 134 families residing in the town. The population density was 504.2 people per square mile (195.3/km2). There were 227 housing units at an average density of 224.0 per square mile (86.8/km2). The racial makeup of the town was 90.02% White, 0.20% Native American, 6.85% from other races, and 2.94% from two or more races. Hispanic or Latino of any race were 26.81% of the population.

There were 196 households, out of which 38.3% had children under the age of 18 living with them, 59.7% were married couples living together, 4.6% had a female householder with no husband present, and 31.6% were non-families. 30.6% of all households were made up of individuals, and 11.2% had someone living alone who was 65 years of age or older. The average household size was 2.61 and the average family size was 3.31.

In the town, the population was spread out, with 31.9% under the age of 18, 6.8% from 18 to 24, 26.8% from 25 to 44, 24.3% from 45 to 64, and 10.2% who were 65 years of age or older. The median age was 33 years. For every 100 females, there were 94.3 males. For every 100 females age 18 and over, there were 96.6 males.

The median income for a household in the town was $32,188, and the median income for a family was $37,708. Males had a median income of $29,792 versus $14,792 for females. The per capita income for the town was $15,086. About 13.9% of families and 10.8% of the population were below the poverty line, including 11.4% of those under age 18 and 12.8% of those age 65 or over.

Education

The Texline Independent School District serves Texline. TISD has only one K–12 school called "Texline Public School."

Notable people

 W.A. Criswell, veteran pastor of the First Baptist Church of Dallas, Texas, was born in Oklahoma but raised in Texline

Notes

References

Towns in Dallam County, Texas
Towns in Texas